Ekholm is a Swedish surname. Notable people with the surname include:

Berndt Ekholm (born 1944), Swedish Social Democratic politician
Börje Ekholm (born 1963), Swedish business executive
Helena Ekholm (born 1984), Swedish biathlete
Jan Ekholm (born 1969), Swedish football player
Jan-Olof Ekholm (1931–2020), Swedish detective fiction writer
Kaarlo Ekholm (1884–1946), Finnish gymnast
Mattias Ekholm (born 1990), Swedish ice hockey player
Nancy Ekholm Burkert (born 1933), American artist and illustrator
Nils Gustaf Ekholm (1848–1923), Swedish meteorologist

Swedish-language surnames